Young Love may refer to:

Comics
 Young Love (comic), a 1949–1977 romance comic created by Joe Simon and Jack Kirby

Film, television and theater
 Young Love, a 1987 Israeli/German film, the seventh in the Lemon Popsicle franchise
 Young Love, a 2001 Finnish film featuring Sari Havas
 Young Love, a 1974 TV pilot starring Meredith Baxter
 Young Love (play), a 1928 Broadway play starring Dorothy Gish

Music
 Young Love (band), a 2005–2009 American electronic rock band

Albums
 Young Love (Connie Smith and Nat Stuckey album), 1969
 Young Love (Mat Kearney album), 2011
 Young Love (J. Williams album), 2009
 Young Love (Jedward album) or the title song (see below), 2012
 Young Love, by Southern All Stars, 1996
 Young Love, by the Tide, or the title song, 2017
 Young Love EP, by Young Love, 2006
 Young Love, an EP by HALO, 2015

Songs
 "Young Love" (1956 song), written by Ric Cartey and Carole Joyner, popularized by Sonny James, Tab Hunter, the Crew-Cuts, Lesley Gore, and Donny Osmond
 "Young Love" (Air Supply song), 1982
 "Young Love" (Janet Jackson song), 1982
 "Young Love" (Jedward song), 2012
 "Young Love" (Kip Moore song), 2013
 "Young Love" (Mystery Jets song), 2008
 "Young Love (Strong Love)", by the Judds, 1989
 "Young Love", by Carter's Chord, 2008
 "Young Love", by Chris Brown from Chris Brown, 2005
 "Young Love", by Gavin DeGraw from Free, 2009
 "Young Love", by Nikki Yanofsky from Solid Gold, 2016

See also
 Young Lust (disambiguation)